Senator Montgomery may refer to:

A. K. Montgomery (c. 1903–1987), New Mexico State Senate
Alexander B. Montgomery (1837–1910), Kentucky State Senate
Betty Montgomery (born 1948), Ohio State Senate
Charles C. Montgomery (1818–1880), New York State Senate
Daniel Montgomery Jr. (1765–1831), Pennsylvania State Senate
Haskins Montgomery (born 1952), Mississippi State Senate
Hugh Montgomery (Northern Ireland politician) (1844–1924), Northern Irish Senate
Sonny Montgomery (1920–2006), Mississippi State Senate
Velmanette Montgomery (born 1942), New York State Senate
William Montgomery (North Carolina politician) (1789–1844), North Carolina State Senate
William Montgomery (Pennsylvania soldier) (1736–1816), Pennsylvania State Senate